Gajewski (feminine: Gajewska; plural: Gajewscy) is a Polish surname. It is related to the following surnames:

People

Gajewski, Gajewska
 Andrzej Gajewski (born 1964), Polish canoer
 Boleslas Gajewski (active 1902), French artificial grammarian
 Fritz Gajewski (1885–1965), German businessman
 Grzegorz Gajewski (born 1985), Polish chess player
 Joanna Majdan-Gajewska (born 1988), Polish chess player
 Karolina Gajewska (born 1972), Polish politician
 Kenny Gajewski (born 1971), American baseball player
 Małgorzata Gajewska (born 1962), Polish field hockey player
 Natasha Gajewski, American businesswoman
 Piotr Gajewski (born 1959), Polish conductor
 Ryszard Gajewski (born 1954), Polish mountaineer
 Victor Gajewski (born 1951), 
 Wacław Gajewski (1911–1997), Polish geneticist

Gayevsky
 Pyotr Gayevsky (1888–unknown), Belarusian-Russian sprinter
 Valery Gayevsky (born 1958), Russian politician

See also
 
 

Polish-language surnames